Cold Cuts may refer to:

 Cold cuts, precooked or cured meat
 Cold Cuts (photo journal), a photo journal exploring Arab queer culture, created in Lebanon in 2017
 Cold Cuts (Paul McCartney album)
 Cold Cuts (Show of Hands album), 2002 
 "Cold Cuts" (The Sopranos), a 2004 fifth-season episode of The Sopranos
 Coldcut, an English electronic music duo